Charles Haudricourt was a French politician, born  in Moliens (Oise), died  in Paris.

Biography 

Working in Paris as a lawyer after studying law, he first became engaged in politics in his home département. As the mayor of his home village, he later became Councillor General of Oise (canton of Formerie), and was elected député for Oise in 1902.

He belonged to the group of Progressive Republicans, and defended the global centrist positions, particularly the logic of Republican Concentration.

In 1906, he was beaten by a radical candidate, and retired from public life.

He died in 1935 in Paris.

References 

1858 births
People from Oise
Republican Federation politicians
1935 deaths